St. Philomena's Forane Church, popularly known as Koonammavu Church is situated in Koonammavu, a northern suburban town of Kochi City of Kerala state, India. This is one of the oldest Roman Catholic churches in India, built in 1837 AD. Even though the church is dedicated to the Virgin Philomena, Saint Chavara Achan's feast is celebrated in every year as the annual festival, a nine-day festival lasting from 26 December to 3 January along with Holy Christmas and the New Year. The church is also popular among non-Christians as a pilgrimage centre and this seventh Forane of  Roman Catholic Metropolitan Archdiocese of Verapoly serves as the Catholic Forane Church of 12 churches listed below.

 Church of Our Lady of Velankanni, Chariyamthuruth	
 Christ the King Church-Christnagar, Varapuzha	
 St. Antony's Church, Kongorpilly, Koonammavu.	
 Church of Our Lady of Rosary, Maloth, Koonammavu	
 Church of Our Lady of Nativity, Muttinakam, Varapuzha	
 St. Joseph's Church, Neerikode, Alangad.	
 Little Flower Church, Panayikulam		
 Sacred Heart Church, Thevarkad, Varapuzha.	
 Infant Jesus Church, Thundathumkadavu, Varapuzha.	
 Amalolbhavamatha Church, Valluvally, Koonammavu
 Our Lady of Mount Carmel and St. Joseph's Minor Basilica, Varapuzha
 St. Antony's Church, Chennur, Varapuzha.

See also 
 Roman Catholic Archdiocese of Verapoly
 Basilica of Our Lady of Good Health
 National Shrine Basilica of Our Lady of Ransom, Vallarpadam
 Our Lady of Mount Carmel and St. Joseph's Minor Basilica, Varapuzha
 Our Lady of Immaculate Conception Church, Manjummel
 Latin Church
 Catholic particular churches and liturgical rites

References

External links
 www.stphilomenaschurchkoonammavu.org
 www.verapoly.in

Roman Catholic churches in Kochi
Roman Catholic churches completed in 1837
Religious organizations established in 1837
1837 establishments in India
19th-century Roman Catholic church buildings in India